NGC 1910, or LH-41, is an OB association in the Large Magellanic Cloud.

Location 
Its angular size is 1.54 arcminutes.

N119 

The cluster has an associated HII region called N119.

Stars 
NGC 1910 contains several stars including S Doradus, LH41-1042, LMC195-1, and R85.

Notes

References  

Dorado (constellation)
Open clusters
1910
Large Magellanic Cloud